The Old Town of Vilnius, one of the largest surviving medieval old towns in Northern Europe, has an area of 3.59 square kilometres (887 acres). It encompasses 74 quarters, with 70 streets and lanes numbering 1487 buildings with a total floor area of 1,497,000 square meters. It was founded by the Lithuanian Grand Duke and King of Poland Jogaila in 1387 on the Magdeburg rights the oldest part of the Lithuanian capital of Vilnius, it had been developed over the course of many centuries, and has been shaped by the city's history and a constantly changing cultural influence. It is a place where some of Europe's greatest architectural stylesgothic, renaissance, baroque and neoclassicalstand side by side and complement each other. There are many Catholic, Lutheran and Orthodox churches, residential houses, cultural and architectural monuments, museums in the Old Town.

Pilies Street is the Old Town's main artery and the hub of cafe and street market life. The main street of Vilnius, Gediminas Avenue, is partially located in the Old Town. The central squares in the Old Town are the Cathedral Square and the Town Hall Square.

One of the most elaborate architectural complexes is the Vilnius University Architectural Ensemble, which occupies a large part of the Old Town and has 13 courtyards. It was selected to represent Lithuania in the Mini-Europe Park in Brussels.

In 1994 the Vilnius Old Town was included as a UNESCO World Heritage Site (No. 541) in recognition of its universal value and originality. It has been recognised as one of the most beautiful cities of the Old Continent that also has the largest baroque Old Town in the whole of Eastern and Central Europe. The definition of "historic center" itself has a broader meaning than the Old Town, formerly encircled with defensive walls. It embraces the valuable historical suburbs of Vilnius, such as Užupis, which historically used to be outside the city boundaries. Therefore Užupis is often considered a part of the Old Town of Vilnius.

352 ha Vilnius Old Town (Senamiestis) as the UNESCO World Heritage Site should not be confused with one of 21 elderships (boroughs) of Vilnius – Senamiestis (the one with a slightly larger territory – 440 ha).

Landmarks
There are more monuments of interest in the Old Town than in any other part of Vilnius; they include:

Palaces

Presidential Palace
Slushko Palace
Radziwiłł Palace
Tyzenhaus Palace
Vilnius Castle Complex with the Gediminas Tower and Royal Palace

Religious monuments
St. Anne's Church
Church of St. Francis and St. Bernard
St. Michael the Archangel Church
Church of St. Johns
Church of St. Casimir
Vilnius Cathedral in Cathedral Square
St. Nicholas Church
All Saints Church
Church of St. Theresa
Gate of Dawn
Three Crosses
Church of St. Catherine
Church of St. Philip and St. Jacob
Orthodox Church of the Holy Spirit
Monastery of the Holy Trinity
Cathedral of the Theotokos
St. Nicholas Church
St. Paraskeva Church

Other places of interest
House of the Signatories
National Museum of Lithuania
Lithuanian National Drama Theatre
 Fragments of the Vilnius city wall
Vilnius dungeons
Vilnius University

References

External links
Vilnius Old Town in postage stamps
Vilnius Old Town - Lithuania Travel

Neighbourhoods of Vilnius
World Heritage Sites in Lithuania
Landmarks in Vilnius
Tourist attractions in Vilnius